The 1949 Detroit Titans football team represented the University of Detroit in the Missouri Valley Conference (MVC) during the 1949 college football season. In their fifth year under head coach Chuck Baer, the Titans compiled a 5–4 record (4–0 against conference opponents), won the MVC championship, and outscored all opponents by a combined total of 179 to 165. The 1949 season was Detroit's first in the MVC.

In addition to head coach Chuck Baer, the team's coaching staff included Bob Ivory (line coach, second year), Eddie Barbour (freshman coach and chief scout), Bill Hintz (freshman coach), and Dr. Raymond D. Forsyth (trainer). Fullback James E. Massey was the team captain.

Schedule

See also
 1949 in Michigan

References

External links
 1949 University of Detroit football programs

Detroit
Detroit Titans football seasons
Missouri Valley Conference football champion seasons
Detroit Titans football
Detroit Titans football